Adrien Beard (born ) is an American producer, storyboard artist and voice actor. He provides the voice of Tolkien Black in South Park, as well as serving as the art director and lead storyboarder on the show.

Beard had won three Primetime Emmy Awards for his work on South Park and has been nominated for two others.

Filmography

Television

Film

Video games

References

External links 
 

Living people
African-American male actors
American male voice actors
American art directors
American storyboard artists
American television producers
Primetime Emmy Award winners
Year of birth missing (living people)
Place of birth missing (living people)
21st-century African-American people